Bert Oosterbosch (born Eindhoven, 30 July 1957, died Lekkerkerk, 18 August 1989) was a Dutch racing cyclist. Oosterbosch was a successful track and road racer.

Early career
In 1978 he won the World amateur team time trial championship (with Jan van Houwelingen, Bart van Est and Guus Bierings). A year later, he turned professional for the TI–Raleighteam of Peter Post. That year he won the World Professional individual pursuit title beating Francesco Moser in the final. He was also three times Dutch pursuit champion.

Road success
As a professional Oosterbosch was especially successful in time trials; he won 14 stage race prologues, including three in the Tour de France. He won three other stages of the Tour: his victory in Bordeaux in 1983 was the one hundredth Dutch stage win in the Tour.

Oosterbosch also won stages in the Vuelta a España and the Tour de Suisse. In 1982 he won the Ronde van Nederland.

Poor health
Oosterbosch suffered poor health on occasions, twice contracting meningitis. In 1988 he was hit by severe knee trouble and had to end his professional career. He returned as an amateur and on 13 August 1989 he won a race. Five days later he died, aged thirty-two years old, after an acute cardiac arrest. He was buried at the Roman Catholic Cemetery Our Lady of Lourdes in Eindhoven. His tombstone depicts cycle racing.

Bert Oosterbosch was married to Marian Bik. The couple had two daughters: Nathalie and Joyce.

Allegations of doping
It has been suggested that Oosterbosch's early death was caused by EPO use, but this is disputed.

Willy Voet, the disgraced former soigneur, talks about Oosterbosch riding the 1982 Grand Prix des Nations. Oosterbosch came in 18th at more than two and a half minutes behind the winner Bernard Hinault, even though he was expected to do well. Voet said "Oosterbosch was flat from the start due to the Synacthen he had taken. The drugs initially blocked his ability to work hard. An hour after the injection it started working as planned and his tempo increased." In fact, Oosterbosch came third in the 1982 event. Voet may be referring to the 1979 or 1984 runnings which Hinault also won.

Major results

1979
 World Professional pursuit champion
1980
 Tour of Luxembourg
 1 stage, Tour de France
1981
 Four Days of Dunkirk
1982 
 Ronde van Nederland
 1 stage, Tour de Suisse
1983 
 Tour of the Americas
 Étoile de Bessèges
 2 stages, Tour de France
1984 
 E3 Prijs Vlaanderen
 Driedaagse van De Panne
 1 stage, Tour de Suisse
1985 
 1 stage, Vuelta a España

See also
 List of doping cases in cycling

References

External links

Oosterbosch at veloarchive.com

Dutch male cyclists
Sportspeople from Eindhoven
Dutch Tour de France stage winners
Dutch Vuelta a España stage winners
Doping cases in cycling
1957 births
1989 deaths
Tour de Suisse stage winners
UCI Road World Champions (elite men)
UCI Track Cycling World Champions (men)
UCI Road World Championships cyclists for the Netherlands
Dutch track cyclists
Cyclists from North Brabant
20th-century Dutch people